Desideratus (died 550) was a French saint from Soissons in the Christian church. 

Disideratus came from a family of saints, as his father, Auginus, mother, Agia, and brothers Desiderius and Deodatus, were all canonized. The parents taught the two boys to care for the poor and to use their possessions to aid others.

Desideratus became chancellor for King Clotaire and sought to eliminate simony and heresy in Clotaire's lands. Desideratus wished to retire to a monastery but Clotaire argued that he should put the needs of his subjects ahead of himself. In 549 he succeeded Arcadius as Bishop of Bourges.

At the fifth Council of Orleans and second Council of Auvergne, he combated Nestorianism.  He died on May 8, 550.  May 8 is his feast day in the west.

References

Sources 
 Hoever, Hugo.  Lives of the Saints.  New York: Catholic Book Publishing, 1977.

550 deaths
Bishops of Bourges
6th-century Frankish bishops
6th-century Frankish saints
Year of birth unknown